Fahadh Fazil (8 August 1982) is an Indian actor and film producer who predominantly works in Malayalam cinema and has appeared in few Tamil and Telugu films. He has acted in more than 50 films and has received several awards, including a National Film Award, four Kerala State Film Awards and three Filmfare Awards South.

Fahadh is the son of filmmaker Fazil. Fahadh began his film career at the age of 19 by starring in the leading role in his father Fazil's 2002 romantic film Kaiyethum Doorath, which was a critical and commercial failure. After a gap of 7 years, Fahadh made his comeback with the anthology film Kerala Cafe (2009), in the short film Mrityunjayam. He attained public attention for his role as Arjun in the thriller film Chaappa Kurishu (2011). Fahadh won his first Kerala State Film Award, the Best Supporting Actor Award for his performance in Chaappa Kurishu along with his performance in Akam. He achieved critical acclaim and recognition for his roles as Cyril in 22 Female Kottayam (2012) and Dr. Arun Kumar in Diamond Necklace (2012). He won his first Filmfare Award for Best Actor for his role in 22 Female Kottayam.

Fahadh achieved further critical and commercial success for his films in 2013, including his performances in the romantic-drama film Annayum Rasoolum, the black-comedy satire film  Amen, the road movie North 24 Kaatham, the drama film Artist, and the romantic-comedy Oru Indian Pranayakadha. He won the Kerala State Film Award for Best Actor for his performances as Michael in Artist and Harikrishnan in North 24 Kaatham. He also won his second Filmfare Award for Best Actor for his role in North 24 Kaatham. He followed it up by starring as Shivadas in the coming-of-age drama film Bangalore Days (2014), which ranks among the highest-grossing Malayalam films. He produced and starred as Aloshy in the 2014 period film Iyobinte Pusthakam under his production company, Fahadh Fazil and Friends Pvt Ltd. Fahadh also has a Digital Entertainment Company/Movie Production House named Bhavana Studios partnered with Dileesh Pothan and Syam Pushkaran.

Fahadh had roles as Mahesh Bhavana in Maheshinte Prathikaaram (2016), Indian diplomat Manoj Abraham in Take Off (2017), and Prasad in Thondimuthalum Driksakshiyum (2017), with Maheshinte Prathikaaram and Thondimuthalum Driksakshiyum winning the Best Feature Film in Malayalam Award at the 64th and 65th National Film Awards. He won the National Film Award for Best Supporting Actor for his performance in Thondimuthalum Driksakshiyum (2017) and his third Filmfare Award for Best Actor – Malayalam. In 2018, he acted as Prakashan in the film Njan Prakashan which ranks among highest-grossing Malayalam films and as Aby in the film Varathan. In 2021, Fahadh portrayed the titular anti-hero in the crime drama Joji which received acclaim and later received nationwide acclaim from critics for his performance in the political thriller Malik.

Early life and education
Fahadh is the son of film director Fazil and his wife Rozina. He has two sisters, Ahameda and Fatima, and a brother, Farhaan, also an actor. He completed his schooling from SDV Central School Alappuzha, Lawrence School Ooty and Choice School Tripunithura. He went on to pursue his degree from Sanatana Dharma College, Alleppey and M.A. in philosophy from University of Miami in the United States.

Acting career

Debut, comeback and breakthrough (2002–2012) 
Fahadh's first film, Kaiyethum Doorath (2002) was directed by his father, Fazil and was a failure at the box office. Fahadh later defended his father, stating "don't blame my father for my failure because it was my mistake and I came into acting without any preparation of my own". After his debut, he moved to the United States for five years, where he pursued his studies, before returning in 2009 to act in the film Kerala Cafe (2009), conceived by director Ranjith. At Ranjith's behest, director Uday Ananthan cast Fahad in his Mrityunjayam, one of the 10 shorts in the film. He played the role of a journalist in the Mrityunjayam, a ghost film set on a spooky old 'Mana'. He was chosen to co-star in B. Unnikrishnan's Pramani. He then appeared as a business head in the thriller Cocktail (2010). His next film, Tournament, was also a thriller.

His performance in Sameer Thahir's directorial debut Chaappa Kurishu (2011), a thriller in which he appeared as the head of a construction business was appreciated. "Arjun – my character in Chappa Kurishu is not a role that an actor gets often. I am very lucky and very fortunate," Fahad said. He shot a long kissing scene with his co-star Remya Nambeesan in the film – supposedly the first-ever in Malayalam cinema – which upon release was termed controversial. Fahadh's next film, Akam (2011) a contemporary adaptation of Malayattoor Ramakrishnan's psycho-thriller novel Yakshi, had him playing Srinivas, a young architect, who starts suspecting that his beautiful wife is a yakshi. "Playing Srinivas was like re-inventing myself. We had a workshop before shooting began and I had ample opportunity to explore the nuances of the character. In the process of re-inventing Srinivas, I reinvented myself," said Fahadh. The film premiered at the Dubai International Film Festival. He won the Kerala State Film Award for Second Best Actor in 2012 for his performance in Chappa Kurishu and Akam.

In 2012, he played a negative character in 22 Female Kottayam, a rape and revenge film, which was critically acclaimed. In his next film, Lal Jose's Diamond Necklace (2012), he played the role of an oncologist working in Dubai and the film centred on the doctor's relationship with three different women. Both the films 22 Female Kottayam and Diamond Necklace were a commercial and critical success and ran over 100 days in theatres. In June 2012, a case was registered against Fahadh by the Kochi Town Central Police for violation of the rule against public display of images of smoking. A poster of Diamond Necklace that showed him smoking a cigarette had been on display before the Kavitha Theatre in Kochi since the film was released. In his next film, Lijin Jose's Friday (2012) he acted as an auto rickshaw driver. The same year, he appeared in The Day of Judgement, one of the three featurettes from the portmanteau film D Company.

Critical acclaim (2013–2017) 
In the year 2013, his important films were cinematographer Rajeev Ravi's directorial debut Annayum Rasoolum, Lijo Jose Pellissery's Amen, V. K. Prakash's Natholi Oru Cheriya Meenalla, Salam Bappu's directorial debut Red Wine, debutant Anil Radhakrishnan Menon's North 24 Kaatham and Sathyan Anthikad's Oru Indian Pranayakatha. He won Kerala State Film Award for Best Actor for his performance in North 24 Kaatham. Amen was both commercial and critical success and was named as one of the best films of the year by Khaleej Times while Annayum Rasoolum managed to be commercial success. Oru Indian Prayankatha was a sleeper hit.

In 2014, he acted in the big budget movie Iyobinte Pusthakam, which was produced by himself. Fahadh also played a major role in the multi-starrer blockbuster movie Bangalore days. It is considered one of the best Malayalam movies made during the New gen movement. The year 2015 was a dull year for him as he was unable to pull off a successful project. He starred in Ayal Njanalla, Haram, Mariyam Mukku, all of which did not perform well at the box office.

In 2016, his first release, Monsoon Mangoes, failed at the box office, even though his performance was highly praised and the movie gathered good critic responses. His next release was on 5 February 2016 Maheshinte Prathikaaram which went on to become commercial success. It was highly applauded by both audience and critics,this film was a major breakthrough in his career. In 2017, he acted in four films out of which Take Off and Thondimuthalum Driksakshiyum were commercial and critical success. Thondimuthalum Driksakshiyum won three awards at the 65th National Film Awards. Besides Best Malayalam Film and Best Screenplay for the film, Fahadh won in the Best Supporting Actor category. Fahadh made his debut in Tamil cinema, through the film Velaikkaran starring Sivakarthikeyan, opposite whom he plays the antagonist.

Experimentation of genres and stardom (2018–present) 
Fahadh got back to back critical and box office successes with Varathan (2018), Njan Prakashan (2018) and Kumbalangi Nights (2019), which collectively grossed more than  100 crore at the box office. He played the character Shammi in Kumbalangi Nights, which developed a cult following with many of his dialogues becoming popular. Njan Prakashan collected ₹52 crore from Worldwide box office, which is one of the highest grossing Malayalam film till date. His last film in 2019 was the psychological thriller Athiran, where he played the role of a psychiatrist. It largely received positive reviews and performed well at box office. His next Tamil film was Super Deluxe, in which he co-starred alongside Vijay Sethupathi, Samantha Ruth Prabhu and Ramya Krishnan, his performance in the film was well appreciated by critics, with them saying his character was written well.

His first release in 2020, Trance received wide acclaim from critics. The Indian Express praised Fahadh's performance and said: "Fahadh steals the limelight by portraying a character that is hysteric and disturbing at the same time". After Trance, Fahadh turned to do films released through OTT platforms amid the COVID-19 pandemic in India. Among this, the first movie was C U Soon (2020), which is India's first computer screen film. It generally received positive reviews from critics.

His first release in 2021, was Irul, a mystery thriller released on streaming platform Netflix on 2 April 2021. Despite the film received mixed reviews due to its complex story, Fahadh received critical acclaim for portraying a mysterious character. Five days after the release of Irul came out Joji, which is a crime drama directed by Dileesh Pothan. The movie in which he played the titular anti-hero received well acclaim from critics. His performance in it is also considered one of his career best by some critics and fans. Firstpost wrote: "The story is unequivocally centred around Fahadh's character, and the actor plays a deceptively calm layabout simmering with rage with the sort of unassuming brilliance that is now his trademark". Nearly a week after the release of Joji, reports came out that the Film Exhibitors United Organisation of Kerala (FEUOK) has warned Fahadh against acting in movies made for streaming through OTT platforms. It was also reported that FEUOK has also threatened that his next big movies in 2021 like Malik will face difficulties for screening on the big screen if he continues to cooperate with OTT platforms as a consequence. But the organisation later claimed that all such news were baseless and they no connection with them.

Fahadh's next release in 2021 was Mahesh Narayanan's big budget political thriller Malik. The film which was supposed to release in 2020 was also Fahadh's most expensive Malayalam film to date. Besides Fahadh, the film stars Nimisha Sajayan, Vinay Forrt, Dileesh Pothan and Joju George in pivotal roles. Malik received nationwide acclaim from critics and large positive feedback from fans, with many critics describing Fahadh's performance in the film as arguably his career best. Fahadh made his debut in Telugu cinema with Pushpa: The Rise (2021) as the antagonist of the film.

In 2022, he was seen along with Kamal Haasan in the film Vikram as Amar, a black-ops agent.

Filmography

Personal life

On 20 January 2014, he got engaged to Malayalam film actress Nazriya Nazim whom he married on 21 August 2014 at Trivandrum. The pair got to know each other more on the sets of Anjali Menon's Bangalore Days (2014), in which they played the roles of husband and wife. Fahadh revealed that their parents had been pivotal in arranging the marriage.

Brand endorsement
He has also appeared in several advertisements for brands like Titan, Milma, Jos Alukkas, Adithi Aatta, Bombay gold and diamonds, UAE Exchange and Estilocus.
l

Awards and nominations

References

External links

Fahadh Faasil on Facebook

Living people
Male actors from Kochi
Male actors from Alappuzha
Indian male film actors
Kerala State Film Award winners
Male actors in Malayalam cinema
University of Miami alumni
1982 births
Male actors in Telugu cinema
21st-century Indian male actors
Male actors in Tamil cinema
Malayalam film producers
Film producers from Kochi
South Indian International Movie Awards winners
Best Supporting Actor National Film Award winners
People from Alappuzha district
Filmfare Awards South winners